Alfredo Manuel Mousinho Esteves (born 6 April 1976 in Lisbon, Portugal) is a Portuguese-East Timorese former footballer. He began his management career at Albion Park White Eagles before being sacked in the 2012 season. He is now currently the coach of Fernhill under 20s as well as being the coaching coordinator at Albion Park Junior Football Club.

International career 
Esteves was the captain of the Timor-Leste national football team, and earned 14 caps for the squad between 2003 and 2008 when he decided to retire from the national team. He made his senior international debut in the 2004 Tiger Cup against Malaysia on 12 December 2004 and last played for the national team in the 2008 AFF Suzuki Cup qualification against Laos on 25 October 2008 when he scored his first ever international goal.

International goals

Personal life
Although born in Portugal, Esteves holds dual citizenship with Timor-Leste.

References

External links

1976 births
Living people
Footballers from Lisbon
Portuguese footballers
Portuguese expatriates in Italy
East Timorese footballers
Expatriate footballers in Italy
USL First Division players
Portuguese expatriates in the United States
Seacoast United Phantoms players
Expatriate soccer players in the United States
Minnesota Thunder players
Expatriate soccer players in Australia
C.D. Aves players
Portuguese expatriates in Australia
Portuguese expatriate sportspeople in Australia
Timor-Leste international footballers
East Timorese football managers
Association football defenders
East Timorese expatriate footballers
Portuguese emigrants to East Timor
G.D. Gafanha players